Victoria Azarenka and Marina Erakovic won the title by defeating Nikola Fraňková and Ágnes Szávay 6–0, 6–2 in the final.

Seeds

Draw

Finals

Top half

Bottom half

Sources
Draw

Girls' Doubles
Australian Open, 2005 Girls' Doubles